The chickadees are a group of North American birds in the family Paridae included in the genus Poecile. Species found in North America are referred to as chickadees, while other species in the genus are called tits. 
They are small-sized birds overall,  usually having the crown of the head and throat patch distinctly darker than the body. They are at least 6 to 14 centimeters (2.4 to 5.5 inches) in size.

Their name reputedly comes from the fact that their calls make a distinctive "chick-a-dee-dee-dee", though their normal call is actually "fee-bee," and the "chick-a-dee-dee-dee" call is an alarm call. The number of "dees" depends on the predator.

The chickadee (specifically the black-capped chickadee Poecile atricapillus, formerly Parus atricapillus) is the official bird for the US states of Massachusetts and Maine, the Canadian province of New Brunswick, and the city of Calgary, Alberta.

One holarctic species is referred to by a different name in each part of its range: grey-headed chickadee in North America and Siberian tit in Eurasia.

Habitat 
Chickadees are native to North America, where they are very common. In North America, the birds are found from the East Coast to the West Coast, and from Canada to Mexico. The habitat that chickadees prefer is mixed deciduous or coniferous forests, parks, open woods, cottonwood groves, willow thickets, and disturbed areas.

Memory
Mountain chickadees are food-caching birds.  A single bird can hide as many as 80,000 individual seeds, which they retrieve during the winter. Their ability to do so depends on their spatial memory of the locations. Birds that live in harsher conditions, where their ability to remember the location of food is more important, have been found to have better memory abilities, a larger hippocampus, and more neurons than chickadees that live in milder climates where food sources are easier to find without relying on memory.

Species
Black-capped chickadee (Poecile atricapillus)
Boreal chickadee (Poecile hudsonicus)
Carolina chickadee (Poecile carolinensis)
Chestnut-backed chickadee (Poecile rufescens)
Grey-headed chickadee (Poecile cinctus)
Mexican chickadee (Poecile sclateri)
Mountain chickadee (Poecile gambeli)

References

Bird common names